In Greek mythology, Theogone was the mother of the Lydian king Tmolus by Ares. Her son was gored to death by a mad bull as punishment for his crime against the nymph Arrhippe, one of the followers of Artemis.

Note

References 

 Lucius Mestrius Plutarchus, Morals translated from the Greek by several hands. Corrected and revised by. William W. Goodwin, PH. D. Boston. Little, Brown, and Company. Cambridge. Press Of John Wilson and son. 1874. 5. Online version at the Perseus Digital Library.

Women of Ares
Women in Greek mythology